The Jumla rebellion was a revolt in the Kingdom of Nepal against the Gorkha conquest of Jumla. The people of Jumla did not accept Gorkhas as their rulers which sparked recurring rebellions.

Aftermath 
In October 1794 the Government of Nepal sent a letter to the people which read:

In 1794, Ranajit Kunwar was replaced by Subba of Jumla. Kunwar was given a royal order which said to cancel all fines, restore all slaves, horses, and other things that were unjustly taken. Later, Subba Ranjit Kanwar, Subedar Dhanjit Rana, and other military officials deputed to Jumla, were given another royal order which read: We have now received reports that even then you have enslaved members of the families of the rebels. We had then ordered you to restore such slaves to freedom, but none of you have obeyed the order. You shall be punished if you do not do so even after receiving this order".

References

Citations
 

18th-century rebellions
Jumla District
Unification of Nepal
1793 in Nepal